The first year of the Best Seller list saw 55 manga titles and one light novel title make their appearances. Of these, eight titles reached the top of the weekly list (in order of number of weeks at the top of the list, from highest to lowest): Naruto, 18 weeks; Bleach, 9 weeks; Vampire Knight, 7 weeks; Fruits Basket, 4 weeks; Negima!, 3 weeks; Chibi Vampire, 1 week; Fullmetal Alchemist, 1 week; and Warriors: Ravenpaw's Path, 1 week. Naruto and Warriors: Ravenpaw's Path were the only two titles to reach the top rank on the week of their debut.

The Best Seller list debuted at a time when the release schedule of Naruto was being accelerated; its releases occupied a majority of the first weekly top ten rankings. Junjo Romantica became the first yaoi (boys' love) title to enter the Best Seller list when it debuted in week 28. Death Notes L: Change the World became the first light novel to enter the top ten rankings in week 43. Adam Kepler noted that vampire literature had become popular over the previous year, and he featured Vampire Knight in the introduction to the week 46 list. It was the first manga title to be featured in the introduction which accompanies list.

Weeks are numbered according to the convention used in the United States, which labels the week containing January 1 as the first week of the year.

Fan book release

Light novel release

References

2009
Manga industry
2009 in comics
The New York Times Manga Best Sellers of 2009